Brett Van Blankers (born April 11, 1987) is a Canadian racing driver from New Westminster, British Columbia.

After karting, Van Blankers moved to Formula Renault 1600 in 2004. In 2005 he competed in FR1600 and the Formula TR 2000 Pro Series finishing 7th in points. In 2006 he competed in 9 Indy Pro Series races for Brian Stewart Racing with a best finish of 7th at Watkins Glen International. He finished 9th in points. He has not participated in a professional race since and now operates an excavator for his family's demolition business in Vancouver.

References

1987 births
Racing drivers from British Columbia
North American Formula Renault drivers
Indy Lights drivers
People from New Westminster
Living people
24 Hours of Daytona drivers
Rolex Sports Car Series drivers